Bond is a census-designated place and unincorporated community in northern Stone County, Mississippi, United States. It was first named as a CDP in the 2020 Census which listed a population of 506.

History

Bond developed as a timber and sawmill community, and was home to J.E. North Lumber Company from 1899 to 1910.  The lumber company's sawmill was located near the Gulf and Ship Island Railroad, which operated between Gulfport and Jackson, Mississippi.  At its peak, the J.E. North sawmill produced 60,000 board feet of lumber per day, but went into receivership during the Panic of 1907, and was sold in 1910, forming the Bond Lumber Company.

Under new ownership, the sawmill increased production of lumber to 150,000 board feet per day.  In 1915, L.N. Dantzler Lumber Company purchased the mill, but ceased operation there in 1919, as the supply of virgin pines was exhausted.  In 1920, the Bond sawmill was dismantled and sold to General Equipment Company, of New Orleans, Louisiana.

By 1907, the Bond community had several stores and churches, a post office, a public school, and a bank.  Once the virgin pine resource was depleted in south Mississippi, small sawmill towns, like Bond, faded rapidly, and the bank, school, and post office closed. One of the early churches, originally "Bond Methodist Episcopal Church" and now bearing the name "Bond United Methodist Church", was formed in 1885, and continues active ministry at its location along U.S. Route 49 in Bond.
 
Dizzy Dean, elected to the Baseball Hall of Fame and well-known sportscaster, was a resident after his retirement in the late 1960s. The Bond community was the family home of his wife, Patricia Nash.  Dean's home in Bond was named Deanash, a combination of his name and his wife's maiden name; it was deeded by Dean's widow during her lifetime to the Mississippi Baptist Convention, which operates foster homes for children in a rural setting. Mrs. Dean retained a life estate in the property and lived there until her death. Since Patricia Nash Dean's death, the home has continued to be used as a home place for children by the Mississippi Baptist Convention.

Another noteworthy resident was Clayton Rand, who was an author and newspaperman, of some note, in the first half of the 20th century. Rand's formative years were spent in the Bond Community.

Demographics

2020 census

Note: the US Census treats Hispanic/Latino as an ethnic category. This table excludes Latinos from the racial categories and assigns them to a separate category. Hispanics/Latinos can be of any race.

Education 
The Bond community is served by the Stone County School District.

Transportation
Highway: U.S. Route 49.
Railroad: Kansas City Southern Railroad.

References

Unincorporated communities in Mississippi
Unincorporated communities in Stone County, Mississippi
Census-designated places in Stone County, Mississippi
Gulfport–Biloxi metropolitan area